An annular solar eclipse occurred on March 28, 1922. A solar eclipse occurs when the Moon passes between Earth and the Sun, thereby totally or partly obscuring the image of the Sun for a viewer on Earth. An annular solar eclipse occurs when the Moon's apparent diameter is smaller than the Sun's, blocking most of the Sun's light and causing the Sun to look like an annulus (ring). An annular eclipse appears as a partial eclipse over a region of the Earth thousands of kilometres wide. Annularity was visible from Peru, Brazil, French West Africa (parts now belonging to Senegal, Mauritania and Mali), British Gambia (today's Gambia) including capital Banjul, French Algeria (today's Algeria), Italian Libya (today's Libya), Egypt, Kingdom of Hejaz and Sultanate of Nejd (now belonging to Saudi Arabia), and British Kuwait.

Related eclipses

Solar eclipses 1921–1924

Saros 128

Notes

References 

1922 3 28
1922 3 28
1922 in science
March 1922 events